The rivière Trois Milles (English: Three Mile River) is a tributary of Lake Saint-Georges (which is crossed by the Gamache River), flowing in the municipality of L'Île-d'Anticosti, in the Minganie Regional County Municipality, in the administrative region of Côte-Nord, in province of Quebec, in Canada.

The main forest road on Anticosti Island that starts from Port-Menier goes up this valley and cuts the river just south of Princeton Lake.

Airport operations are the main economic activity in this valley.

Geography 
The Trois Milles River has its source at Princeton Lake located in the western part of Anticosti Island. Princeton Lake is fed by a stream (coming from the north). The mouth of this lake is located at the end of the bay on the south shore, at:
  north-east of one of the runways at Port-Menier airport;
  north of the town center of the village of Port-Menier;
  south-east of the north shore of Anticosti Island.

From its source, the Trois Milles river flows south-west between the Gamache river (located on the west side); and the rivière aux Canards (located on the east side).

  towards the south, up to a bend in the river (coming from the northeast);
  towards the south-west in a relatively straight line, passing to the south-east of the Port-Menier airport and passing under the bridge of the road leading to the airport, until 'at its mouth.

The Trois Milles River empties onto the northeast shore of Lac Saint-Georges, which in turn empties into Gamache Bay which is connected to the Gulf of St. Lawrence.

Toponymy 
This toponymic designation is based on the fact that the road leading to the airport crosses this watercourse three miles from the center of the village of Port-Menier.

The toponym "Rivière Trois Milles" was made official on September 12, 1974, at the "Banque des noms de lieux" de la Commission de toponymie du Québec.

See also 

 Minganie Regional County Municipality
 L'Île-d'Anticosti, a Municipality
 Anticosti Island, an island
 Gulf of Saint Lawrence
 List of rivers of Quebec

References

External links 
 

Rivers of Côte-Nord
Anticosti Island
Minganie Regional County Municipality